British Soldierflies and their allies (an illustrated guide to their identification and ecology) is a book by Alan E. Stubbs and Martin Drake, published by the British Entomological and Natural History Society in 2001. A second edition was published in 2014.

It is a sequel to an earlier volume, British Hoverflies: an identification guide, and covers the following families of flies, which collectively are known as the "Larger Brachycera": Acroceridae, Asilidae, Athericidae, Bombyliidae, Rhagionidae, Scenopinidae, Stratiomyidae, Tabanidae, Therevidae, Xylomyidae and Xylophagidae.

The book introduced English names for all included species, the first time this has been done in a scientific reference work for a whole group of flies.

It contains a set of photographic plates by David Wilson.

See also
 List of soldierflies and allies of Great Britain

References

External links
 British Soldierflies and Their Allies (2nd Edition) British Entomological & Natural History Society website

Entomological literature